Bebearia fontainei is a butterfly in the family Nymphalidae. It is found in Sankuru in the Democratic Republic of the Congo.

References

Butterflies described in 1981
fontainei
Endemic fauna of the Democratic Republic of the Congo
Butterflies of Africa